Mickey Conn (born November 9, 1971) is an American football coach and former player who is currently the co-defensive coordinator and safeties coach at Clemson University. He has served in various assistant coaching roles at Clemson since 2016, including as defensive assistant in 2016, safeties coach from 2017 to 2020 and special teams coordinator and safeties coach in 2021.

Conn played college football at the University of Alabama as a defensive back from 1990 to 1994. Prior to his tenure at Clemson, Conn held a head coaching position at Grayson High School in Loganville, Georgia and two assistant coaching positions at South Gwinnett High School in Snellville, Georgia and at the University of Alabama.

Playing career
Conn walked on to play defensive back for Gene Stallings at Alabama from 1990 to 1994 eventually getting a scholarship. He redshirted his freshman season and lettered from the 1992 national championship season to 1994.

Coaching career

Alabama
Conn began his career in coaching at his alma mater Alabama in 1996 where he worked as a graduate assistant under his former head coach, Gene Stallings. He was retained in 1997 under Mike DuBose’s new staff also as a graduate assistant.

High school
In 1998 and 1999 Conn coached at his former high school, South Gwinnett High School in Atlanta. For the next 16 years Conn was the head coach at Grayson High School where he compiled a 137 and 48 record.

Clemson
Conn joined Clemson's coaching staff under his former teammate Dabo Swinney in 2016 as a defensive assistant. In 2017 he was promoted to safeties coach. For the 2021 season he was given the additional responsibility of being the team's special teams coordinator.

On December 14, 2021, Conn was promoted to co-defensive coordinator and safeties coach, alongside Wes Goodwin, replacing Brent Venables after his departure to become the head coach at the University of Oklahoma.

Personal life
Conn is the uncle of Appalachian State Mountaineers quarterback Chase Brice. Conn and his wife Halie have two children.

References

External links
Clemson Tigers bio

1971 births
Living people
American football defensive backs
Alabama Crimson Tide football coaches
Alabama Crimson Tide football players
Clemson Tigers football coaches